Checker Hall is a populated place in the parish of Saint Lucy, Barbados. Youth Milan FC is based in Checker Hall.

See also
 List of cities, towns and villages in Barbados

References

Saint Lucy, Barbados
Populated places in Barbados